Bu of Wa (武) was a Japanese king in the late 5th century (middle Kofun era).

Son of Sai of Wa and brother of Ko of Wa, he was the last of the "Five kings of Wa". He is considered to be the 21st Emperor Yūryaku.

Records

Annotations 
FootnotesReferences

See also 
 Five kings of Wa
 Emperor Yūryaku
 Inariyama Sword

External links 
 漢籍電子文献資料庫 - 台湾中央研究院

Five kings of Wa